Hand guards are devices worn by athletes in artistic gymnastics. Various types of hand guards are used by gymnasts:

 Grips are used on the uneven bars, high bar, still rings and parallel bars to enhance the gymnast's grip and, in the case of bar exercises, to reduce friction between the gymnast's hands and the bar.
 Hand braces do not offer the gymnast any performance advantage, but help to prevent injury by providing support and lessening impact on the wrists and hands. 
 Wrist guards are usually worn by male gymnasts performing on the pommel horse, and sometimes by female gymnasts on the floor exercise or vault. 

Gymnastics apparatus
Protective gear
Handwear